John Wayne Gacy (1942–1994) was an American serial killer and sex offender.

Gacy may also refer to:

People
Madonna Wayne Gacy (born 1964), stage name of Stephen Gregory Bier Jr., American keyboardist, formerly of Marilyn Manson
 Joe Gacy (Real name Joseph Ruby, born 1987), American professional wrestler signed to WWE.

Film
Gacy (film), 2003 film about John Wayne Gacy
Dear Mr. Gacy, 2010 Canadian film
Dahmer Vs. Gacy, 2010 film
8213: Gacy House, 2010 film
Bruce and Pepper Wayne Gacy's Home Movies, 1988 Canadian film